Needles High School (NHS) is a public high school in Needles, California. It is part of the Needles Unified School District. The school mascot is the Mustang, and the school colors are royal blue and white. The current alma mater, "All Hail to Thee," was written by members of the Class of 1959 as their gift to NHS as outgoing seniors.  The school offers many extracurricular activities, including athletics, ASB (Associated Student Body), the Mock National Security Workshop, among others. Needles High School was featured on a School Pride television episode November 12, 2010. Needles High is one of five California high schools that are part of the Nevada Interscholastic Activities Association.

Traditions
"Senior Appreciation Day," formerly known as "Slave Day," is an annual event where Senior students buy Freshmen students for one day (although to be a Senior "slave master," you must have been a Freshman "slave").  The Freshmen push, pull or carry their owner (using various modes) from class to class, much to the delight and astonishment of other classmen.  The day's event is highlighted by a huge picnic on the football field and races or other activities around the track.  While NHS has had this tradition around for quite some time, the origin of it is unknown.

"The Underpass" Incoming seniors from NHS buy specific spots auctioned near the end of the school year and paint them, adding personal touches, to include whimsical or meaningful images or phrases. The underpass is on K Street (owned by then-Santa Fe Railway Company, who has now donated it for such purpose).  The painting occurs in mid-August; the members of the incoming Senior class decorate their space with artwork of their choice.  The "artwork" is then displayed until the following August, when the walls are whitewashed, and the decorations begin anew.

Athletics
Needles High is one of five California high schools that is a member of the governing body for high school athletics in Nevada, the Nevada Interscholastic Activities Association, rather than the California Interscholastic Federation. All five of these schools are close to a large number of Nevada schools and relatively isolated from other California schools. Needles' football team, as well as the other school athletic teams, competes in the NIAA AA Football Division. On November 17, 2007, the Mustangs won the 2A State Championship game, played at Damonte Ranch High Stadium in Reno, Nevada, defeating the Yerington High School Lions, 18–14. On February 25, 2017, the Lady 'Stangs won the NIAA AA State Championship in Basketball, defeating Democracy Prep at the Agassi Campus, 64–54.

Nevada Interscholastic Activities Association State Championships 
Baseball - 1990, 1991, 1995, 1997, 1999, 2000, 2008, 2009 
Basketball (Boys) -1988, 1991,1999, 2002, 2009
Basketball (Girls) - 2008, 2009, 2016, 2017
Football - 2007
Softball - 1989, 1990, 1991, 1997, 1998, 2000, 2007, 2008, 2009, 2010, 2017, 2019, 2022

C.I.F. Championships 
Baseball - 1959
Basketball - 1950
Football - 1962, 1965

Notes and references

 

High schools in San Bernardino County, California
Public high schools in California